Jason Reza Jorjani (born February 21, 1981) is an American philosopher, writer, former New Jersey Institute of Technology lecturer, former editor-in-chief of the European New Right publishing company Arktos Media, and co-founder of the AltRight Corporation with Richard Spencer.

Early life
Jason Reza Jorjani was born and raised in Manhattan, New York, the only child of an Iranian immigrant father of Turkic Qajar descent and a mother who comes from a working class family of "northern European heritage." He is a dual citizen of the United States and Iran.

He attended the Dalton School, on the Upper East Side. After high school, he attended Fordham University for a year before transferring to New York University, where he earned undergraduate and graduate degrees. In 2013, he received a PhD in philosophy from Stony Brook University on Long Island.

Career
While serving as a full-time faculty member at the New Jersey Institute of Technology, Jorjani taught courses on science, technology, and society (STS), the philosophy of Martin Heidegger, and the history of Iran. In 2016, Jorjani became editor of alt-right publisher Arktos Media.

Academic suspension and lawsuit
In September 2017, Jorjani was suspended from his teaching position at the New Jersey Institute of Technology in response to a covert video recorded by Patrik Hermansson, a Swedish antifascist activist, in which Jorjani predicted a future where concentration camps would return to Europe and Adolf Hitler would appear on European currency by 2050:

 Hermansson met with Jorjani at an Irish bar in midtown Manhattan in June, where the two talked about a future in which Europe embraces fascism. “It’s going to end with the expulsion of the majority of migrants including citizens, who are of Muslim descent, generally” Jorjani said. “That’s how it’s going to end. It’s going to end with concentration camps and expulsion and war. At the cost of a few hundred million people.”

Jorjani claimed that his remarks were spliced into pieces from a two-hour conversation and rearranged out of context, and that the prediction was a warning of a dystopian future, not an endorsement.

In February 2017, NJIT officials told Jorjani they would not renew his annual teaching contract. In July 2018, Jorjani filed for a $25M lawsuit against NJIT, alleging that campus officials violated Jornani's constitutional right to freedom of speech and association and that campus leaders and colleagues subsequently defamed Jorjani in campus-wide emails and in the student newspaper. Denise Anderson, a spokeswoman for the school, denied the allegations and said, “Dr. Jorjani’s claims of wrongdoing by the university or its representatives are untrue, and we intend to vigorously defend against any such claims.”

In March 2019, U.S. District Judge William Martini ruled that Jorjani does not have a case for defamation, stating: “The general allegation is implausible because the facts alleged do not support an inference that defendants knew the recording was edited to misconstrue plaintiff’s actual views."

Association with Richard Spencer
Jorjani had met Richard Spencer at a National Policy Institute conference, at which both of them spoke. At the conference attendees gave Nazi salutes as Spencer led the crowd in shouting "Hail Trump!" Jorjani subsequently claimed that he did not intend to speak at the conference and that he rejected the white nationalist ideology Spencer began integrating into their organization.

Founding of the AltRight Corporation
In January 2017, Jorjani co-founded AltRight Corporation and AltRight.com with Richard Spencer before resigning less than a year later in August 2017, for the stated reasons that he wanted to commit to the Iranian Renaissance, a 501(c)(3) cultural organization. Jorjani ultimately took a negative view of the AltRight Corporation, referring to it as a "miscarriage" and "total failure".

Views
Jorjani's ideas have been described by journalist Olivia Hardhill as influenced by Dark Enlightenment philosophy, particularly that of Nick Land.

Prometheism and the Prometheist Manifesto

In "The Prometheist Manifesto", Jorjani criticised the modern concept of God as a "jealous and tyrannically wrathful God-Father, archetypally identical to Zeus". Instead, Jorjani supported the idea of the myth of Prometheus as the creator of Man and likened the fire that he stole from Olympus as a symbol of the power of technology and science to free humanity from scarcity and ignorance.

In the section of the manifesto entitled "Techno-Scientific Apocalypse", Jorjani supports Martin Heidegger's views on technological science and argues that Heidegger's views on the topic are Futuristic, similar to that of the ideas of the 20th Century Italian Futurists. Firstly, Jorjani talks of Heidegger's view that technology is not a practical application of what is known, but rather ontologically prior to science. As a result, he concludes that the universe does not predate human technology as all knowledge about the universe can only be attained through the use of technology. Secondly comes the view that humans have a unique relationship with technological science, which he refers to as Technoscience. This relationship makes both the existence of technology dependent on humanity, and vice versa. Thirdly, is the idea that "Technoscience" has the power to overcome nature. This is not restricted to just ‘human nature’ but also our perception of nature. Jorjani argues that Heidegger anticipated both biotechnology and virtual reality. Next, he claims that Heidegger’s interpretation of "technoscience" means that Technoscience not only has a function, thereby making it teleological, but also moves towards a singularity and a destined end of history. After this point, human existence, Jorjani believes, will be completely transformed.
Finally, Jorjani comments on this singularity and connects it to Heidegger's idea that only a god can save humanity from the danger of human instrumentality. Jorjani believes that this god is Prometheus. The same deity that drove technological progress. 

From here, Jorjani begins to talk on the end of humanity, arguing that Genetics, Robotics, Information, and Nanotechnology (or GRIN) threatens the very existence of human nature. Genetic engineering for example could significantly extend the human lifespan, eliminate disease and potentially even be able to increase mathematical and spatial reasoning. He also believes that advancements in Robotics will eventually cause robots to outperform humans in all fields of work outside of the arts, thereby meaning that humans will no longer need to work. On nanotechnology, Jorjani argues that it could easily have a significant impact on economics and industry as it would open up new ways to increase production of practically any commodity. Alongside this, he states that assuming other cures to cancer have not been found, nanotechnology could be used to destroy tumours that would otherwise have been inoperable. He thus sees the advancement of GRIN as a necessary step in transforming the human race into a society of "supermen". However, Jorjani is also critical of other aspects of GRIN, believing that it would result in the end of sexual dimorphism. 

Despite his criticisms of the Technological Singularity, Jorjani also regards it as a possible revolutionary force as well as an evolutionary one. Jorjani argued that various groups such as  military-industrialists, corporatists, and "masterminds of intelligence operations and psychological warfare" may have thought of the changes that will come to the world with the technological singularity and as a result may decide to abandon Earth and then ending the civilisations of Earth in order to prevent the occurrence of the singularity. In doing so, Jorjani believes that they will create a depopulated neo-feudal world to rule over after the prevention of the singularity.

Jorjani claimed that these people consider themselves the only ones who can endure such singularity-level technological breakthroughs and thus wish to prevent others from accessing them. Eventually, these groups will be able to form  self-sufficient civilization while everyone left on Earth ends up regressing to feudalism and pre-industrial culture. Jorjani believes that such a process must be completely opposed and that in doing so, humanity has to face the end of humanity, history and reality. The subsequently created society would be one of people with a  Prometheist outlook and ethos, alongside the ability and will to make a Posthuman community, as opposed to a self-appointed elite.

At the same time, Jorjani also believed that the achievement of such a singularity would bring the very strong possibility of a Totalitarian political system. He argued that technologies like genetic engineering, nanotechnology and Artificial Intelligence would pose a threat to humanity as it would require a very large amount of control over the population to ensure security, privacy and liberty. Jorjani also criticises the ideas of Ayn Rand by saying that the ideas posited by Rand in Atlas Shrugged is fundamentally opposed to Prometheism. Such a Promethean society, Jorjani believes, will result in the deconstruction of psychological and societal norms. As a result, the Promethean will to affirm the Singularity means to call for the overthrow of all established political and economic systems. In Jorjani's view, the most collectivist societies and the most individualist ones value the protection of humans from bodily harm and a right to privacy. However, he also argues that this will likely come to an end with the development of Nano-technology and Artificial Intelligence. For example, Nanobots could be hacked or used by commonplace AIs. Such nanobots could provide surveillance of everything and everyone. Jorjani believes that it would even be possible for them to be turned into instruments of remote assassination. To Jorjani, the only way to deal with such a threat without establishing a totalitarian regime (which Jorjani criticses as something directly opposed to the idea of Prometheanism as well as being incapable of handling a society with such technology) would be to create what he calls a "maximal trust society" in which the population consists solely of those who always wish the best for each other. Such a society would have to strive to be world encompassing, as an "outside" to it could not be allowed to exist in the eyes of the Promethean. 

Jorjani believes that not everyone will be able to endure the future and only a few people will be able to become Prometheans in such a society. Such a person would have to be someone who lives with integrity and authenticity, someone with a worldview that is oriented towards an affirmation of the liberty of other people alongside their own personal enrichment, from the subconscious level upwards – is oriented toward a kind of personal enrichment that profoundly affirms the liberty of others and their pursuit of their potential and someone who could present new ideas, creative visions into a world where labour is handled by robotics. He believes that the belief systems of Judaism, Christianity, Islam, and Hinduism are incompatible with the Promethean society.  Various political ideologies are seen in the same way, such as liberal Democracy, Capitalism, Nazism, Social Democracy, Communism and Confucianism. Jorjani qualifies this statement by saying that he does not wish to eliminate “undesirables” of any kind. Instead he argues that in the event that a "controlled collapse" is engineered by those in the "breakaway civilization", through the use of civil disobedience, Prometheists will attempt to turn a controlled collapse into an uncontrolled one, as a extinction of humanity is seen by Jorjani to be preferable to the success of a breakaway civilization.

Views on white nationalism
Jorjani states that he is not a white nationalist or racist (specifically stating that white nationalism is a "bankrupt ideology and extremely destructive") and identifies himself as a progressive and a feminist. After resigning from AltRight, he stated that the organization was "reduced, basically, to a platform for organizing alt-right rallies attended by some very questionable individuals who I want not very much to do with" and "If I had known that this is where things would wind up, I would never had gotten involved in the first place."

However, speaking at a conference organized by Richard Spencer in Washington, Jorjani referred to the collapse of the Sasanian Persian Empire as the "first and greatest white genocide."

He has predicted that Muslim citizens and immigrants will be deported from Europe by 2050, and stated that such deportations would "follow from continued, ill-advised policies regarding mass migration in Europe."

According to Harrison Fluss and Landon Frim writing in Jacobin, Jorjani has attracted negative attention due to his promotion of various fringe theories popular among white nationalists and conspiracy theorists:
Jorjani’s writings, political activities, speeches, and media appearances have drawn charges of antisemitism and Islamophobia. In one instance, he suggested that Yahweh and Allah were actually space aliens who enslaved their believers and tricked them into committing genocide. He has openly characterized certain high-ranking Nazi officials as akin to supermen with psychic powers. While Jorjani has vehemently denied the charges of bigotry leveled against him, his public statements do make you wonder.

Support for Israel and Zionism
Jorjani has identified himself as a Zionist, stating that he has "always believed that there is absolutely no conflict between the legitimate national interests of Iran and Israel. In fact, in the case of each, no other nation on Earth has more of a mutual interest than the other."

Support for eugenics in Iran
Jorjani has written in support of eugenics and has claimed that Iran cannot culturally, technologically, and scientifically advance unless it restores its "pre-Arab and pre-Mongol genetic character":
The Arab-Muslim invasion was bad, but once this was compounded by the genocidal Turkic and Mongol conquests of Iran, a demographic shift took place that deprived Iran of the genetic basis for the production of a Hegel, Nietzsche, or Heidegger. Such men are less than one in a million, even in a genetically pure Aryan population. But their thinking goes on to impact millions in the broader intellectual culture of their nation. Now, I’m not saying that for this reason Iran will never produce thinkers on this level again. With the emerging technologies of embryo selection and genetic engineering, it would be possible, with the right leadership and government planning, to restore the pre-Arab and pre-Mongol genetic character of the majority of the Iranian population within only one or two generations. I’m sorry to have to suggest that this might be necessary in order to Make Iran Great Again.

COVID-19 Lab Leak Theory

In the Prometheist Manifesto, Jorjani argues that COVID-19 engineered at the Wuhan Virology Laboratory in China.

Works
Prometheus and Atlas (February 18, 2016) 
World State of Emergency (July 28, 2017) 
Lovers of Sophia (August 1, 2017) 
Novel Folklore: On Sadegh Hedayat's The Blind Owl (May 22, 2018) 
Iranian Leviathan: A Monumental History of Mithra's Abode (September 1, 2019) 
Prometheism (September 5, 2020) 
Faustian Futurist (November 29, 2020) 
Closer Encounters (August 21, 2021) 
Uber Man (March 26, 2022)

References

External links

1981 births
Living people
21st-century non-fiction writers
21st-century American philosophers
New Jersey Institute of Technology faculty
American critics of Islam
American eugenicists
American people of Iranian descent
American Zionists
Alt-right writers
New York University alumni
Stony Brook University alumni
21st-century Iranian philosophers